WD repeat-containing protein 24 is a protein that in humans is encoded by the WDR24 gene.

References

Further reading